Eric Philip Lesser (born February 27, 1985) is an American lawyer and politician who served in the Massachusetts State Senate. Before representing his hometown of Longmeadow, Massachusetts, and neighboring communities in the Greater-Springfield area, he worked as a White House aide during the Obama administration. Lesser is one of the originators of the White House Passover Seder. In the 2022 Massachusetts race for Lieutenant Governor, Lesser lost the Democratic primary to Kim Driscoll.

While in the State Senate, Lesser championed progressive causes, including advocating for a high-speed rail connection between eastern and western Massachusetts. He proposed and passed the Student Loan Borrower Bill of Rights as well as provisions for job training, tourism and the arts, substance abuse treatment, and environmental issues, among others.

In 2016, Lesser was the only candidate in Massachusetts to receive the endorsement of President Barack Obama.

Early life and education 
Lesser grew up in Longmeadow, Massachusetts, and graduated from Longmeadow High School. While in high school, Lesser worked with students, parents, and teachers to increase school funding and prevent lay offs. He also worked for Congressman Richard Neal and Senator Ted Kennedy. Lesser was an active member of Sinai Temple, coordinating volunteer activities for high school students, and an active volunteer with the Longmeadow Democratic Town Committee.

Lesser's father, Martin, is a family doctor in Holyoke, Massachusetts, and a member of the Massachusetts National Guard. In 2010, he served a tour of duty in Iraq. Lesser's mother, Joan, is a social worker in Holyoke.

After high school, Lesser received his bachelor's degree in government from Harvard College. While in college, Lesser worked on Deval Patrick's gubernatorial campaign. He led the Harvard College Democrats and a policy group on Congressional Redistricting Reform. At Harvard University's Institute of Politics, he started a public policy research program.

Lesser returned to Harvard after his work on Barack Obama's 2008 presidential campaign and in the Obama White House. He received his J.D. from Harvard Law School, where Business Insider named Lesser one of the "most impressive Harvard Law students." Lesser is a member of the Massachusetts Bar and the Federal District of Massachusetts Bar.

Early years: 2008 campaign & the White House

Obama presidential campaign 
After college, Lesser joined Barack Obama's 2008 presidential campaign, helping stage events in New Hampshire. Following Obama's near victory in the New Hampshire Democratic primary, Lesser was tapped to be the campaign's "Ground Logistics Coordinator." In that position, he traveled with then-Senator Obama to 47 states and six countries—over 200,000 miles in total. Lesser created a luggage-management system that earned him the trust of the campaign team, the traveling press, and his future boss, Obama advisor David Axelrod. Reflecting on Lesser's logistical prowess, President Obama said, "Eric Lesser may be running a Fortune 500 company one day," adding "we are lucky to have such a smart and committed young man as part of our team."

During a campaign stop in Harrisburg, Pennsylvania, Lesser organized an impromptu Passover Seder. When Obama arrived, he promised: "Next year in the White House."

White House aide 

When the campaign ended, the Senior Advisor to President Obama, David Axelrod, tapped Lesser to serve as his Special Assistant. For two years, Lesser shared a wall with the Oval Office. The Washington Post described Lesser as a "wunderkind," and the New York Times called him a "West Wing mascot." In 2011, Lesser became the Director of Strategic Planning at the Council of Economic Advisers. In the White House unit charged with offering the President objective economic advice, Lesser coordinated the communications strategy behind the economic recovery and historic job creation of the Obama administration.

White House Seder 

Lesser was a chief organizer of the first presidential Seder in American history. The annual White House Passover Seder was attended by President Barack Obama, First Lady Michelle Obama, and their daughters. The Seder is a reunion of the original group who met in Harrisburg, Pennsylvania during the 2008 campaign. Lesser brought handmade shmurah matzah from the Chabad-Lubavitch center in Springfield, MA. Over the years the Seder grew in prominence. President Obama discussed the Seder with Israeli Prime Minister Benjamin Netanyahu, and Sara Netanyahu gave the President a silver Seder plate to use in subsequent White House Seders. President Obama spoke about the Seder in a speech before the American Israel Public Affairs Committee and in an address before the Israeli people.

Massachusetts State Senate

Elections 
On February 3, 2014, The Republican newspaper reported that Lesser was considering a bid for the First Hampden & Hampshire seat in the Massachusetts State Senate that was recently vacated by Sen. Gale Candaras. On February 18, 2014, Lesser announced his candidacy for Massachusetts State Senate. On September 9, Lesser won the five-way Democratic primary. On November 4, Lesser defeated Republican Debra Boronski and America First candidate Mike Franco to win the State Senate seat.

Lesser launched his reelection bid in September 2016 after an uncontested Democratic primary. On November 8, 2016, Lesser defeated James "Chip" Harrington, earning 56 percent of the vote to Harrington's 44 percent. During the campaign, Lesser attracted a series of high-profile endorsements, including both U.S. Senators from Massachusetts, Elizabeth Warren and Ed Markey; U.S. Representatives Richard Neal, Joe Kennedy III, and Seth Moulton; former Massachusetts Governor Michael Dukakis; and Springfield, Massachusetts mayor Domenic Sarno. Notably, Lesser earned the endorsement of his former boss, President Barack Obama, who only endorsed 161 candidates nationwide that year. That year, Obama endorsed no other candidate in Massachusetts. Lesser was sworn in for a second term in the Massachusetts State Senate on January 4, 2017.

Lesser won his third and fourth elections to the Massachusetts State Senate in 2018 and 2020, running uncontested each time in the Democratic primary and general election.

2022 lieutenant gubernatorial election 

In January 2022, Lesser announced his campaign for lieutenant governor of Massachusetts. If elected, he would be the first Jewish person and the first millennial to be lieutenant governor or governor in Massachusetts. He would also be the first Democrat from western Massachusetts to serve in the role since 1853.

Policy priorities

High-speed rail 
Lesser is a leading advocate of a high-speed rail system to connect between eastern and western Massachusetts. He believes that a high-speed rail line between Pittsfield and Boston would transform the region, increasing employment and boosting the economy in western Massachusetts. In his first month in office, Lesser filed a bill that would require a report of the costs and benefits of building higher-speed rail across the state. The State Senate passed Lesser's feasibility study unanimously, 39–0, and the State House of Representatives later passed the measure. Governor Charlie Baker vetoed the legislation; it was later revealed that Peter Picknelly, the chief executive of Peter Pan Bus Lines, had personally lobbied the governor, sending Baker an email urging him to reject the proposal. Picknelly donated $1,000 to Baker's election campaign and hosted a campaign fundraiser for him.

In 2018, the Massachusetts Department of Transportation (MassDOT) announced their intention to study Lesser's east–west high-speed rail proposal; Lesser called this step a "major breakthrough." Lesser's proposed high-speed rail connection has gained the widespread support, including U.S. Senator Elizabeth Warren, nearly all western Massachusetts lawmakers, transportation advocate and former Governor Michael Dukakis, the Boston City Council, and business leaders like the Greater Springfield and Greater Boston Chambers of Commerce. In 2019, MassDOT offered six alternatives for the rail project and, in January 2021, narrowed the options to three.When President Joe Biden signed the Bipartisan Infrastructure Deal in November 2021, the East–West Rail project (or "West–East Rail") gained renewed momentum. Congressman Richard Neal, who currently chairs the powerful House Ways & Means Committee, noted that the "$66 billion that Amtrak will receive has the potential to be transformative nationwide but also right here in western and central Massachusetts." Lesser has spoken about the project with Secretary of Transportation Pete Buttigieg, Lesser's former classmate at Harvard.

The project, if completed, could take 10,000 cars off the road which, in addition to reducing traffic and congestion on the Mass Pike, would reduce greenhouse gas emissions in the region.

Opioid epidemic 
After the heroin epidemic resulted in 185 deaths in the first four months of 2014, Lesser created and published a four-point plan with concrete steps to address addiction. His plan included: the addition of more drug courts specializing in sending drug users to treatment instead of jail in Western Massachusetts, work to end dependence on prescription drugs through partnerships with the U.S. Food and Drug Administration (FDA) and other organizations, investment in new treatments that have shown promise in decreasing withdrawal symptoms, and an increase in the availability of the drug Narcan, which can save lives by reversing the effects of a heroin overdose.

In January 2015, Lesser filed two bills regarding opioid misuse. Lesser's bills served as the blueprint for the plan ultimately adopted by the Massachusetts State Senate in its 2015 budget, which allocated $100,000 in state funds to buy doses of the drug Naloxone, commonly known as Narcan, which can reverse opiate overdoses. Later in 2015, Massachusetts Attorney General Maura Healey announced a settlement with Amphastar Pharmaceuticals, Inc., the manufacturer of naloxone, in which Amphastar paid $325,000 into the state's bulk purchasing program. The state's fund spent $377,000 to buy 11,050 doses of naloxone and 8,750 applicators; as of November 30, 2016, 8,500 doses have been distributed to cities and towns in Massachusetts, saving local communities an estimated $186,000.

The legislation has saved tens of thousands from potentially fatal overdoses. In January 2017, Massachusetts Public Health Commissioner Dr. Monica Bharel told the Public Health Council that 50,000 people in Massachusetts were now trained to administer Narcan, and more than "1,500 overdose rescue reports — each a life saved — were received in the first six months of 2016." By 2021, those numbers had dramatically risen, with "more than 584,000 naloxone doses" distributed and "more than 32,000 overdose reversals using the state-funded naloxone," according to the Department of Public Health.

Education 

Lesser is a leading advocate for civics education in Massachusetts. In 2018, following the deluge of misinformation in the 2016 campaign cycle, a bill was signed into law to develop the next generation of leaders. The bill cemented civics education in public school curricula and required student-led civics projects. Another provision, which Lesser had championed, highlighted media literacy. Promoting the skills needed to critically analyze written and digital sources, Lesser said that, "Young people can, and must be, part of the solution to our most pressing challenges. But in order to do that, they need to understand how our democracy works and have the basic skills to tell fact from fiction and evaluate news versus commentary." The bill also directed the Massachusetts Secretary of State to establish a non-partisan high school voter challenge program to encourage eligible students to register or pre-register to vote.

Lesser also supports increased investment in vocational training. Vocational schools typically supplement core instruction at public schools with specialized training in lucrative and in-demand markets: machine training, biotechnology, and more. For Lesser, vocational training is part of a future-proofing the economy. In 2019, Lesser said, "We need to build solar panels, wind turbines, and other pieces of equipment to help propel us forward to a high-tech economy. This is not your grandfather’s manufacturing; this is really sophisticated work we can use to build our future." Lesser has proposed legislation to address the long waitlists at vocational schools in Massachusetts.

Student debt crisis 
Lesser, calling America's $1.5 trillion in student loan debt a "generational crisis," has proposed a Student Loan Borrower Bill of Rights to increase oversight of student loan servicers and protect borrowers. In January 2021, Lesser passed the provision as a part of the $627 million economic development bill that he negotiated as the Senate Chair of the Joint Committee on Economic Development and Emerging Technologies.

Between 2001 and 2016, Massachusetts spend 32% less per student on higher education. At the same time, student debt has grown faster in Massachusetts than any other state in the country. This burden disproportionately impacts people of color: Twenty years after starting college, the median debt of white borrowers decreases by 94%, while the median debt for Black borrowers decreases by only 5%.

The Student Loan Borrower Bill of Rights protects the over 55% of Massachusetts college graduates with debt from their studies by:

 Requiring student loan servicers to acquire a state-level license
 Prohibiting servicers from engaging in predatory, unfair, and unlawful practices
 Creating a new Student Loan Ombudsman position in the Massachusetts Attorney General's Office to field complains from borrowers and help them navigate repayment options.

Attorney General Maura Healey described the bill's impact during an interview with Lesser. She said, "“It’s going to empower my office with more tools, more resources, to help stand up for student borrowers. I think this is a really important resource for student loan borrowers in our state.” In the conversation with Healey, Lesser told the story of his constituent who took out loans to earn her master's degree and work as a special education teacher. When the mother of two was diagnosed with cancer, she could not work. Even then, Lesser said, "She could not even get her loan servicer on the phone [...] to try to get questions answered about potential forbearance or assistance programs." Addressing Healey, he added, “At least now, they can call your office.” As of December 2021, student debt has ballooned to $1.73 trillion.

Lesser sits on the advisory board of the Student Borrower Protection Center, an advocacy group for student loan borrowers.

Economic growth 

In January 2021, as the COVID-19 pandemic suffocated Massachusetts residents and businesses, Lesser led the negotiations for an economic recovery and development bill. The legislation prioritized small business relief, support for workers, and housing development. Provisions included $40 million for a program to redevelop blighted buildings, $20 million for rural community development and infrastructure grants, and $102.3 million for local economic development projects. As the bill's negotiators approached a funding deadline, Lesser quipped, "The Earth was created in six days. We can create an eco[nomic] dev[elopment] bill in five." The package also included Lesser's Student Loan Borrower Bill of Rights, described above, and a special commission on the future of work, in line with the ideas described below.

Lesser is a state-wide and national leader on the future of work. He is the co-chair of the 17-member Future of Work Commission that is developing a report on the "impact of automation, artificial intelligence, global trade," and other economic trends affecting drivers, musicians, and gig workers. Defined by statute, the commission's goal is to "ensure sustainable jobs, fair benefits and workplace safety standards for workers in all industries," such as "adequate and affordable health insurance, financial security in retirement, unemployment insurance and disability insurance." Lesser is also the co-chair of the Future of Work Initiative at NewDEAL, a national network of pro-growth, progressive state and local elected officials.

As a part of his advocacy for good jobs and strong workers, Lesser is the co-chair of the Gateway Cities Caucus. These 26 communities across Massachusetts all had a legacy of economic success but have struggled as the state's economy shifted toward skills-centered knowledge sectors (concentrated in the Boston-area). Efforts to improve conditions in these areas take manifold forms. For example, Lesser fought to bring technological innovation to western Massachusetts. He worked to pass the Mass Life Sciences Bill, a major investment that included $3.9 million for Baystate Medical Center in Springfield, Massachusetts, to create a new clinical trials unit.

Lesser has also proposed a remote worker relocation program, which would pay $10,000 over two years to employees that could move to western Massachusetts to work from home. His plan is similar to one currently in place in Vermont.

Housing 
The economic relief and development package that Lesser negotiated included historic housing reform, designed to address the housing crisis and encourage new construction. The National Low-Income Housing Association released a statement in support of the legislation that detailed its effects: "The legislation includes the first comprehensive zoning reform changes in Massachusetts in 40 years and authorizes $115 million for transit and climate-resilient affordable housing development and neighborhood stabilization activities. The bill also doubles the Massachusetts Low Income Housing Tax Credit program to $40 million per year."

Racial justice 
Lesser established the Nonprofit Security Grant program alongside Senate President Emerita Harriette Chandler in 2017. In the program's first year, $75,000 were allocated to religious and cultural institutions to address safety and security concerns. The grants increased to nearly $1 million in 2021 and, in fiscal year 2022, the Senate unanimously voted to increase the total amount available in grants to $1.5 million. The increases come as the country and local communities in Massachusetts face more frequent incidents of hate targeting LGBTQ+, Black, Jewish, Asian, and Muslim groups.

In June 2020, Lesser attended the Black Lives Matter protests in Springfield, Massachusetts. "We had a lot of great conversations. People came up, introduced themselves, shared their stories, and we chatted and I learned a lot," he said. "You know the stories of hearing young people, 16-, 17-,18-years-old, very clearly very conscientious, very motivated young people, talk about their experiences of not feeling safe around police, should really alarm everyone." But, Lesser concluded, "we are not powerless."

To protect civil liberties, Lesser has proposed a bill requiring law enforcement to obtain a warrant before accessing data collected on drivers on the Mass Pike. The tolls collect drivers' license plates and information about speed, date, time, and location. Lesser's proposal makes an exception for immediate threats to life and public safety emergencies.

Lesser served on the Governor's Task Force on Hate Crimes, which advises on the prevalence, prevention, and recovery from hate crimes.

Environment 

In 2008, there was a proposal to build a 42-megawatt, wood-burning power plant in Springfield, Massachusetts. A coalition of environmental and racial justice activists, from the project's inception, resisted. Representing Springfield in the State Senate, Lesser was a vocal opponent of the plant, alongside local leaders and U.S. Senators Elizabeth Warren and Ed Markey.

In April 2021, the Massachusetts Department of Environmental Protection announced that they would revoke the project permit to build the biomass power plant. In reaction, Jaqueline Vélez, a racial justice organizer with Jobs with Justice, said, "Communities of color are already disproportionately impacted. They already have underlying medical issues. To add a power plant, a biomass burning power plant that would exacerbate folks’ medical conditions just emphasizes how communities of color and low income communities are targeted for these projects."

Lesser called the decision "long overdue" and that "the plant should never have been considered for that location in the first place."

Protecting seniors 

In May 2014, Lesser published an opinion piece in the Springfield Republican detailing a plan to support the increasing population of adults over 65 in Western Massachusetts. Lesser believes that in-home healthcare should be more affordable so that seniors can stay in their homes as long as possible. His plan also includes two points to protect the physical and financial security of the elderly. Lesser wrote that the state should provide increased oversight of in-home healthcare agencies in order to reduce instances of elder abuse, and he supports the increased availability of computer and financial literacy education opportunities to decrease the number of seniors who fall victim to online and phone scams.

Since 2017, Lesser has hosted an annual "Thrive After 55" Wellness Fair where participating organizations answer questions and offer information about their resources to local seniors. During the coronavirus pandemic, the fair shifted online, offering virtual programming on financial security, identity theft, healthcare, and wellness.

Government accountability 
Lesser has spearheaded the inquiries into three major scandals over the past few years.

Registry of Motor Vehicles 
On June 21, 2019, seven members of a New England motorcycle club were killed when a truck, pulling a car hauler, crashed into the group. The negligent driver was licensed in Massachusetts and had a history of violations. His license should have been revoked. The crash revealed that the Massachusetts Registry of Motor Vehicles (RMV) had knowingly failed to process a backlog of notifications from other states. The 53 boxes of notifications, dating back to 2008, included more than 10,000 driving violations. Within a month of the crash, the processing of these notifications resulted in over 2,000 license suspensions.

Lesser, who served as the Vice Chair of the Joint Committee on Transportation at the time, participated in the oversight hearings. Upon first request, the Baker administration officials did not appear. Eventually, Lesser questioned the director of the Merit Rating Board, Thomas Bowes, who was most directly responsible for processing these notifications. One line of questioning changed the trajectory of the investigation:Lesser: So as the person in charge when an auditor came to you and said, "Sir, we have 12,829 open tasks in basically unread notifications in an area you’re responsible for," what was your response?

Bowes:  That I was not aware of those tasks because the Merit Rating Board has not scanned any out-of-state documents.

Lesser:  And did you ask for help?

Bowes:  I have asked one of our IT folks what that might have been. The person didn’t seem to have the answer for me.

Lesser:  So did you ask anyone else after the IT person clarified it for you?

Bowes:  I have not.

Lesser:  You asked one IT person and that was the end of it?

Bowes: Yes.The Boston Globe reported that Bowes, when the scandal broke, was in England. He attended the Red Sox–Yankees game in London; Governor Baker was also in attendance. Soon after the oversight hearing, Lesser called for Bowes's resignation, saying that he had "lost the confidence of the public."

Lesser has since proposed legislation to force the RMV to process these out-of-state notifications, before tragedy strikes again.

COVID-19 Vaccine Rollout 

Lesser criticized the vaccine rollout in Massachusetts as messy and uncoordinated. Lesser sponsored an emergency bill to set up a one-stop website for COVID-19 vaccination appointments, as well as a 24-hour hotline. The Baker administration's website had directed users to third-party websites, making it difficult when appointments were scarce and, generally, for elderly residents. “The system is cumbersome, contradictory, and asks residents over 75 to navigate a haze of web links, locations, and instructions, each with different criteria and scheduling systems,” Lesser said. “And for those with limited ability to navigate the internet, there is no access to appointment booking at all.”

As the rollout continued, long lines in cold weather prevented many Massachusetts residents from receiving the vaccine. One resident said, "“It was just very frustrating. I feel sorry for the older people who were obviously struggling with the cold and just being able to stand that long. That’s a long time to wait in line and stand in 27-degree temperatures.”

Lesser requested that Baker appear before the legislature's COVID-19 oversight committee to answer questions. When Baker showed up, he was pressured by Lesser and others. As a member of the committee, Lesser dismissed Baker's characterization of the rollout as "lumpy and bumpy," calling it "a failure." When the Baker administration first unveiled their vaccine appointment registration website, it crashed. Residents were left with an image of an octopus. Following Baker's appearance before Lesser and the committee, the administration fixed the broken website, streamlined the system to book appointments, and signed new contracts to ensure that the rollout continued in a safe and efficient manner.

Holyoke Soldiers' Home 
The Soldiers' Home in Holyoke is a state-operated veterans' facility that provides health care, hospice care, and other services. In April 2020, the Massachusetts attorney general's office learned of "serious issues with COVID-19 infection protocols." Staffing shortages led the facility to consolidate two dementia wards with infected veterans and healthy residents, increasing the risk of contracting the virus. In June, investigators released a 174-page report that detailed what one worker described as "total pandemonium" and a "nightmare."

The report quoted one employee who said it “felt like it was moving the concentration camp, we were moving these unknowing veterans off to die.” A social worker described listening to the chief nursing officer say “something to the effect that this room will be dead by Sunday, so we will have more room here.” Another social worker recalled seeing a supervisor point to a room and say, “All this room will be dead by tomorrow.” The outbreak killed at least 76 residents at the Soldiers' Home.

The Holyoke Soldiers' Home was flagged for renovation in 2012 and received matching funding from the Veterans' Administration, but no progress was made until thousands of veterans and friends signed a petition in 2020. By contrast, the Chelsea Soldiers' Home was approved for renovation and received matching funding in 2017; construction began in 2018. The Boston Globe investigations team found that Gov. Baker and the state health secretary were close to the management issues at the home.

Lesser helped secure a $600 million bond for an entirely new Holyoke Soldiers' Home and increased veterans' services statewide.

Trump administration

Electoral College 
After Hillary Clinton won the popular vote but lost the 2016 U.S. presidential election because Donald Trump won more votes in the Electoral College, Lesser filed a resolution in the Massachusetts State Senate calling on the U.S. Congress to propose an amendment to abolish the Electoral College. "It has now been twice in 16 years, and five times total in American history, that a president and vice president have been elected by winning a majority of the Electoral College, despite the fact that they lost the national popular vote," Lesser said in a statement. "Given the importance of empowering voters to believe every vote counts in a presidential election, the repeal of the Electoral College merits a thorough discussion and examination."

Transgender Rights 
In response to President Trump's transgender military policy, Lesser sent a letter to Governor Baker in June 2019 asking him to oppose Trump's ban and publicly reaffirm support for transgender service in the Massachusetts National Guard.

Transportation 
On January 25, 2017, Lesser sent a letter to President Donald Trump urging him to include a high-speed rail line between Springfield and Boston on his list of infrastructure priorities.

Outside of the State House 
Lesser holds a number of national recognitions, including a Rodel Fellowship in Public Leadership at the Aspen Institute. He is the co-chair of the Future of Work Initiative at NewDEAL, a national network of pro-growth, progressive state and local elected officials. He also sits on the advisory board of the Student Borrower Protection Center, an advocacy group for student loan borrowers. Lesser is a term member of the Council on Foreign Relations.

Lesser has taught workshops on campaigns, elections, and public policy at Harvard's Kennedy School of Government and a class on millennial leadership in local and state politics at the University of Massachusetts Amherst.

Lesser worked as a script consultant with HBO on the television show Veep for seven seasons.

Personal life 
Lesser married attorney Alison Silber on December 31, 2011. The couple has three children.

Electoral History
In 2018 and 2020, Lesser did not face any opponents in the 1st Hampden and Hampshire Democratic Primary and General Election.

See also
 2019–2020 Massachusetts legislature
 2021–2022 Massachusetts legislature

References

External links

Legislative website (2015–2022)

1985 births
21st-century American politicians
Harvard College alumni
Harvard Law School alumni
Living people
Democratic Party Massachusetts state senators
People from Longmeadow, Massachusetts